Uchiza Airport  is an airport serving the town of Uchiza in the San Martín Region of Peru. The runway is south of the town, alongside and between road 12A and a tributary of the Huallaga River.

See also

Transport in Peru
List of airports in Peru

References

External links
OpenStreetMap - Uchiza
OurAirports - Uchiza
Uchiza Airport

Airports in Peru
Buildings and structures in San Martín Region